The Nipissing Central Railway (NCR), sometimes known as the Temiskaming Streetcar Line, is a former interurban streetcar system connecting New Liskeard, Haileybury and Cobalt on the western bank of Lake Temiskaming in northern Ontario from 1910 to 1935. As the line had a federal charter, the operating company continues to be used to operate the Ontario Northland Railway freight spur line between Swastika, Ontario and Rouyn-Noranda, Quebec, avoiding the need to re-charter either end in its respective provinces.

History

In 1902 the Ontario government chartered the Temiskaming & Northern Ontario Railway (T&NO) to connect the towns of New Liskeard and Haileybury on Lake Temiskaming to North Bay on Lake Nipissing. During construction, silver ore was discovered near the Mile 103 post, just southwest of Haileybury. The Cobalt Silver Rush followed, leading to the incorporation of the town of Cobalt in 1906, and a swelling population reaching 10 to 15,000 by 1911.

As the population of all of the towns grew, the need for better transportation between them also grew. The Nipissing Central Railway was granted a federal (Dominion) charter on 12 April 1907, and opened the first portion of the line between Cobalt and Haileybury on 30 April 1910. The route followed King Street out of Cobalt, turning onto the city streets of what is today's North Cobalt (the outskirts of Haileybury) and turning downtown before ending at Main Street in Haileybury.

The line was purchased by the T&NO on 20 June 1911. An extension along Lake Timiskaming to New Liskeard opened on 1 November 1912, ending at Whitewood Avenue. In 1914, an existing spur line on the T&NO to Kerr Lake was electrified and joined to the NCR. This section was abandoned in 1924. Interurban operations on the NCR ended on 9 February 1935.

When the T&NO built a spur line between Swastika and Rouyn-Noranda, they operated it under the charter of the NCR, thereby avoiding problems with crossing the provincial border (the T&NO was incorporated in Ontario). The company exists to this day as the operator of the T&NO spur. The construction of the line was the subject of a legal challenge, The Attorney-General of Quebec v. The Nipissing Central Railway Company and another; it was decided in favour of the railway by the Privy Council in London in 1926

See also

 List of Ontario railways
 List of defunct Canadian railways
 History of rail transport in Canada

References

 "The Rise and Fall of a Mining Camp", Cobalt Mining Legacy
 "Argentite Ghost Town", Ontario Abandoned Places
 George Hilton and John Due, "The Electric Interurban Railways in America", Stanford University Press, 2000, p. 420

Ontario railways
Quebec railways
Street railways in Ontario
Interurban railways in Ontario
Rail transport in Timiskaming District
Temiskaming
Railway companies established in 1907
Ontario Northland Railway
Electric railways in Canada